Cushman Dam No. 1 is a hydroelectric dam on the North Fork of the Skokomish River in Mason County, Washington, which in derogation of the natural and treaty rights of the Native inhabitants impounded and enlarged the formerly natural Lake Cushman, leading to damage claims in excess of $5 billion and an eventual settlement agreement with the Skokomish tribe that terminates the right to operate the dam(s) after 2048. It was built by Tacoma City Light (now Tacoma Power) in 1924–1926. Tacoma's demand for electricity grew rapidly after World War I. Tacoma City Light's Nisqually River Hydroelectric Project, built in 1912, could not meet the demand and the utility decided to build a new hydroelectric project on the North Fork Skokomish River. The dam and powerhouse first began to deliver electricity on February 12, 1926.

It has a concrete arch design and includes 90,000 cubic yards (69,000 m³) of concrete, covering a whole  of water. Two 21,600 kilowatt generators provide 127 million kilowatt-hours annually to the Tacoma Power system.

Construction began on July 7, 1924, under the commissioner Ira S. Davidsson (1918–1940). The transmission of electricity to Tacoma, over lines crossing Tacoma Narrows, was activated, or "formally energized", on March 23, 1926, with the push of a button by President Calvin Coolidge in a ceremony at the White House.

See also

Cushman Dam No. 2
National Register of Historic Places listings in Mason County, Washington

References

External links
Historic American Engineering Record (HAER) documentation, filed under Hoodsport, Mason County, WA:

Dams in Washington (state)
Hydroelectric power plants in Washington (state)
Dams completed in 1926
Buildings and structures in Mason County, Washington
Dams on the National Register of Historic Places in Washington (state)
National Register of Historic Places in Mason County, Washington
Energy infrastructure completed in 1926
United States power company dams
Historic districts on the National Register of Historic Places in Washington (state)
Tacoma Public Utilities